Busman's Holiday is a 1936 British comedy film directed by Maclean Rogers and starring Wally Patch, Gus McNaughton and Muriel George. A bus conductor and his driver manage to round up a gang of criminals. It was made at Nettlefold Studios as a quota quickie for distribution by RKO Pictures. It is also known by the alternative title Bow Bells.

Cast
 Wally Patch as Jeff Pinkerton 
 Gus McNaughton as Alf Green 
 Muriel George as Mrs. Green 
 H. F. Maltby as Mr. Bulger 
 Isobel Scaife as Daisy 
 Robert Hobbs as Harry Blake 
 Norman Pierce as Crook 
 Michael Ripper as Crook

References

Bibliography
 Chibnall, Steve. Quota Quickies: The British of the British 'B' Film. British Film Institute, 2007.
 Low, Rachael. Filmmaking in 1930s Britain. George Allen & Unwin, 1985.
 Wood, Linda. British Films, 1927-1939. British Film Institute, 1986.

External links

1936 films
British comedy films
British black-and-white films
1936 comedy films
1930s English-language films
Films directed by Maclean Rogers
Films shot at Nettlefold Studios
RKO Pictures films
1930s British films